The Price may refer to:

Television episodes
 "The Price" (Angel)
 "The Price", from season 7 of M*A*S*H
 "The Price" (Once Upon a Time)
 "The Price" (Prison Break)
 "The Price" (Star Trek: The Next Generation)

Film
 The Price (1924 film), a 1924 Australian film
 The Price (2016 film), a 2016 Egyptian film
 The Price (2017 film), a 2017 American drama film
 The Price (unreleased film), an unreleased film featuring Noomi Rapace

Other
 The Price (play), by Arthur Miller
 The Price (graphic novel), by Jim Starlin
 "The Price", a short story by Neil Gaiman, originally published in his book Smoke and Mirrors
 "The Price" (song), by Twisted Sister

See also
 Price (disambiguation)
 The Price Is Right (disambiguation)
 The Prize (disambiguation)